Cathay International Television was a Canadian television broadcasting company.

Formed in 1982 when a partnership (consisting of Bernard T.C. Liu, Kent Lee, Sing Kwan So and Brian Sung) as World View as a multi-ethnic regional pay television network in British Columbia, but forced to re-organize under bankruptcy in 1984 when it ran into financial problems and acquire interest in fulfilling 92 hours a week of ethnic broadcasting.

After the departure of Liu, the remaining partners formed Cathay International Television Incorporated (following approval by the CRTC) and changed their format to provide 96% Chinese content on the new channel with the rest with other ethnic programming.

The channels main programming was from Hong Kong with only 21.5 hours from local programming (local programs and news).

The company grew from a Vancouver area broadcaster to become a regional broadcaster (in Calgary and Edmonton), but failed to provide access to non-Chinese programming as required by the CRTC. It was purchased in 1987 by Chinavision Canada to become a national cable channel for Chinese language communities in Canada. Today it is part of Fairchild TV broadcasting network.

Key Personnel

 Kent Lee, President of Cathay and former Director of World View
 Sing Kwan So (1927–2014) Chairman and Secretary, former druggist in Hong Kong and grocer in Guyana and founder of Wing Hing Company of Vancouver
 Brian Sung, Managing director and controller; Vancouver businessman

References

Chinese-Canadian culture in British Columbia
Chinese-language mass media in Canada
Defunct broadcasting companies of Canada